Greenhouse gas emissions by Russia are mostly from fossil gas, oil and coal. Russia emits 2 or 3 billion tonnes CO2eq of greenhouse gases each year; about 4% of world emissions. Annual carbon dioxide emissions alone are about 12 tons per person, more than double the world average. Cutting greenhouse gas emissions, and therefore air pollution in Russia, would have health benefits greater than the cost. The country is the world's biggest methane emitter, and 4 billion dollars worth of methane was estimated to leak in 2019/20.

Russia's greenhouse gas emissions decreased by 30% between 1990 and 2018, excluding emissions from land use, land-use change and forestry (LULUCF). Russia's goal is to reach net zero by 2060, but its energy strategy to 2035 is mostly about burning more fossil fuels.

Sources 

Greenhouse gas emissions by Russia have great impact on climate change since the country is the fourth-largest greenhouse gas emitter in the world. Climate Trace estimate that 60% of the country's emissions comes from fossil fuel operations and 24% from the power sector.

Russia must submit its inventory of 2018 emissions to the UNFCCC by 15 April 2020, and so on for each calendar year.

But according to the Washington Post methane emissions are under-reported.

Energy 
In 2017 Russia's energy sector, which under IPCC guidelines includes fuel for transport, emitted almost 80% of the country's greenhouse gases. Industrial Processes and Product Use (IPPU) emitted over 10%. The largest emitters are energy industries—mainly electricity generation—followed by fugitive emissions from fuels, and then transport. According to Climate Trace the largest point source is Urengoyskoye gas field at over 150 Mt in 2021.

Energy from fossil fuels 
Most emissions are from the energy sector burning fossil fuels.

According to the Russian Science Foundation in 2019, the natural influx of greenhouse gases from terrestrial ecosystems in Russia constantly changes. Measuring these influxes had shown that greenhouses gases into the atmosphere in short time intervals is contributing to the deceleration of warming in Russia.

In accordance with the results obtained, under the scenarios of anthropogenic emissions considered, the natural emissions from the Russian regions will also accelerate climate warming on the short time horizons under the climate conditions of the second half of the 21st century.

Electricity generation 
Public information from space-based measurements of carbon dioxide by Climate Trace is expected to reveal individual large plants before the 2021 United Nations Climate Change Conference.

Gas fired power stations 
Gas fired power stations are a major source.

Agriculture 
In 2017, agriculture emitted 6% of Russia's greenhouse gases.

Waste 
In 2017, waste emitted 4% of the country's greenhouse gases.

Land 

Russian challenges for forests include control of illegal logging, corruption, forest fires and land use.

As well as trees burning peat burning in wildfires emits carbon. Black carbon on Arctic snow and ice is a problem as it absorbs heat.

Mitigation

Energy 
In 2020, Russia released a draft long-term strategy, to reduce  emissions by 33% by 2030 compared to 1990. It did not plan to reach net zero until as late as 2100. Reducing methane leaks would help, as Russia is the largest methane emitter.

Industry 

Efforts to decarbonize steel and aluminium production were delayed by the Russo-Ukrainian war and international sanctions during the 2022 Russian invasion of Ukraine.

Economics 
As Russia has no carbon tax or emissions trading it could be vulnerable to future carbon tariffs imposed by the EU, or other export partners.

Carbon sinks 
Carbon sinks, which in Russia consist mainly of forests, offset about a quarter of national emissions in 2017.

See also 

 Climate Doctrine of the Russian Federation
 Energy policy of Russia
 Greenhouse gas inventory
 List of countries by carbon dioxide emissions
 Plug-in electric vehicles in Russia

References

External links 
 UNFCCC Russia documents - see April NIR and CRF for figures for this article
 Live carbon emissions from electricity generation in European Russia and Ural
 Live carbon emissions from electricity generation in Siberia
 Greenhouse Gas Inventory Data - Flexible Queries Annex I Parties
 NDC Registry
 Climate Action Tracker: Russia
 Climate Watch: Russia

Russia
Climate change in Russia